Sanator may refer to:

 Chionodes sanator, species of moth
 Sanator, South Dakota, unincorporated community